Martin Wuttke (born 8 February 1962) is a German actor and director who achieved international recognition for his portrayal of Adolf Hitler in the 2009 film Inglourious Basterds.

Life and career
Wuttke began his actor training at the college theater in Bochum and then changed to the Westfälische Schauspielschule Bochum (now Schauspielschule Bochum). He played on numerous German-speaking stages: Volksbühne am Rosa-Luxemburg-Platz Berlin, Berliner Ensemble, Schaubühne am Lehniner Platz, Schiller Theater in Berlin, Deutsches Theater Berlin, Deutsches Schauspielhaus Hamburg, Theater des Westens Berlin, the Thalia Theater of Hamburg, Stuttgart State Theater, Freie Volksbühne Berlin, Schauspiel Frankfurt am Main, Schauspielhaus Zürich (CH) and at the Burgtheater in Vienna (AT), where he has been a director and a member of the ensemble since 2009.  When the Berliner Ensemble performed at Berkeley in 1999, his portrayal of Hitler as a petty Chicago gangster in Heiner Müller's adaptation of Brecht's The Resistible Rise of Arturo Ui was described as an "astonishing grotesque... comically loathsome and rivetingly outrageous."

Wuttke lives with actress Margarita Broich and their two children.

Filmography

Films

Television

Awards
 Screen Actors Guild Award for Outstanding Performance by a Cast in a Motion Picture -Inglourious Basterds – Won

References

External links

 Burgtheater – Martin Wuttke
 

1962 births
Living people
Outstanding Performance by a Cast in a Motion Picture Screen Actors Guild Award winners
20th-century German male actors
21st-century German male actors
German male stage actors
German male film actors
German male television actors
People from Gelsenkirchen